Bestavaripeta is a village in Prakasam district of the Indian state of Andhra Pradesh. It is the mandal headquarters of Bestavaripeta mandal in Markapur revenue division.

Demographics 

Bestavaripeta Located on the Guntur – Nandayal Highway.  India census, Bestavaripeta had a population of 6496. Males constitute 53% of the population and females 47%. Bestavaripeta has an average literacy rate of 70%, higher than the national average of 59.5%; with 63% of the males and 42% of females literate. 11% of the population is under 6 years of age.

References 

Villages in Prakasam district
Mandal headquarters in Prakasam district